Silver sulfite is the chemical compound with the formula Ag2SO3. This unstable silver compound when heated and/or in light it decomposes to silver dithionate and silver sulfate.

Preparation
Silver sulfite can be prepared by dissolving silver nitrate with the stoichiometric quantity of sodium sulfite solution, yielding a precipitation of silver sulfite by the following reaction:
2 AgNO3 + Na2SO3  Ag2SO3 + 2 NaNO3

After precipitation then filtering silver sulfite, washing it using well-boiled water, and drying it in vacuum.

References

Silver compounds
Sulfites